Raymond Antoine Sabarich (23 July 1909, in Toulouse – 5 April 1966) was a French composer and trumpeter, a member of Raymond Legrand's orchestra. After studying with Eugène Foveau at the Conservatoire de Paris, he was a professor of trumpet in the same conservatory from 1947 to 1966. Among other things, he was the teacher of Maurice André and Pierre Thibaud.

External links 
 Discography (Discogs)
 Raymond Sabarich
 Raymond Sabarich - Aubade (YouTube)

1909 births
1966 deaths
Musicians from Toulouse
Academic staff of the Conservatoire de Paris
French classical trumpeters
Male trumpeters
20th-century French composers
20th-century trumpeters
20th-century French male musicians